Georges Augoyat (31 January 1882 – 22 March 1963) was a French cyclist. He competed in the men's sprint event at the 1900 Summer Olympics.

References

External links
 

1882 births
1963 deaths
French male cyclists
Olympic cyclists of France
Cyclists at the 1900 Summer Olympics
Cyclists from Paris